Brezik (Cyrillic: Брезик) is a village in the municipality of Kalesija, Bosnia and Herzegovina.

Demographics 
According to the 2013 census, its population was 51.

References

Populated places in Kalesija
Serb communities in the Federation of Bosnia and Herzegovina